Moore-Dalton House, also known as the Margaret Harwell Art Museum, is a historic home located at Poplar Bluff, Butler County, Missouri. It was originally built in 1883, and remodeled to its present form in 1896. It is a two-story, frame dwelling on a brick and stone foundation.  It features a Classical Revival style semi-circular front portico with fluted Ionic columns and a second story balcony.  The house was converted to an art museum by the city of Poplar Bluff in 1979.

It was listed on the National Register of Historic Places in 1994.  It is located in the North Main Street Historic District.

References

External links
Margaret Harwell Art Museum

Individually listed contributing properties to historic districts on the National Register in Missouri
Art museums and galleries in Missouri
Houses on the National Register of Historic Places in Missouri
Neoclassical architecture in Missouri
Houses completed in 1896
Houses in Butler County, Missouri
National Register of Historic Places in Butler County, Missouri